The 2010 Magny-Cours Superleague Formula round was a Superleague Formula round  held on May 23, 2010, at the Circuit de Nevers Magny-Cours, Magny-Cours, France. It was the second round at the Magny-Cours circuit after it hosted its first Superleague Formula event in 2009. It was the third round of the 2010 Superleague Formula season.

Seventeen clubs entered the round including two French clubs, Olympique Lyonnais and GD Bordeaux. PSV Eindhoven missed the round due to driver Narain Karthikeyan's involvement in the NASCAR Camping World Truck Series race on the same weekend.

Support events included the British GT Championship.

Report

Qualifying

Race 1

Race 2

Super Final

Results

Qualifying
 In each group, the top four qualify for the quarter-finals.

Group A

Group B

Knockout stages

Grid

Race 1

Race 2

Super Final

Standings after the round

References

External links
 Official results from the Superleague Formula website

Magny-Cours
Superleague Formula